Stomoxys is a genus of flies in the family Muscidae. The genus is unusual among the Muscidae in that it includes species that are bloodsucking ectoparasites of mammals. The best-known species is Stomoxys calcitrans, most commonly known as the stable fly.

The genus is small, comprising a dozen or two described species, and current evidence suggests that it is paraphyletic as well.

Species
S. bengalensis Picard, 1908
S. bilineatus Grünberg, 1906
S. boueti Roubaud, 1911
S. calcitrans (Linnaeus, 1758)
S. indicus Picard, 1908
S. inornatus Grünberg, 1906
S. luteolus Villeneuve, 1934
S.  Macquart, 1851
S. nigra Macquart, 1851
S. ochrosoma Speiser, 1910
S. omega Newstead, Dutton & Todd, 1907
S. pallidus Roubaud, 1911
S. pullus Austen, 1909
S. sitiens Rondani, 1873
S. stigma Emden, 1939
S. taeniatus Bigot, 1888
S. transvittatus Villeneuve, 1916
S. uruma Shinonaga & Kano, 1966
S. varipes Bezzi, 1907
S. xanthomelas Roubaud, 1937

References

Muscidae
Diptera of Europe
Brachycera genera